Mauritius Commercial Bank (MCB) is a commercial bank in Mauritius. MCB is licensed by the Bank of Mauritius, the country's central bank and the nation's banking regulator. The bank's headquarters are located in Port Louis, Mauritius.

Overview
Mauritius Commercial Bank, founded in 1838, is the oldest and largest banking institution of Mauritius. It is also the oldest banking institution south of the Sahara and one of the oldest banks of the Commonwealth to have preserved its original name. MCB has a local network of 40 modern branches and 150 ATMs.

The holding structure of the MCB Group translates its two-fold strategy namely diversification into financial services through local subsidiaries and associated companies and regional expansion through its foreign subsidiaries. MCB operates in Madagascar, Maldives, Mozambique and Seychelles. The Group has also consolidated its presence in Réunion, Mayotte and Paris through BFCOI, its associate. The MCB opened a representative office in Johannesburg, South Africa in 2008. Moreover, the Group is actively involved in project and trade financing in various countries of the sub-Saharan region, while being engaged in other markets such as India.

History

The beginning 
The Mauritius Commercial Bank’s history started on September 1, 1838 when Governor Sir William Nicolay proclaimed the establishment of La Banque Commerciale de l'îsle Maurice in Port Louis. The bank was an initiative by a group of traders of the capital, headed by Mr. James Blyth and Mr. William Hollier Griffiths, who wanted to establish an alternative to the Bank of Mauritius, which they felt favoured the planters on the island. The bank started business with an authorised capital of £100,000, around 500,000 piastres, in premises situated at rue de Paris, subsequently rue Desforges, now Sir Seewoosagur Street.

In 1839, Queen Victoria granted a Royal Charter to the newly established bank under the name of The Mauritius Commercial Bank (MCB). The British government renewed the charter every twenty years until 18 August 1955 when the Bank became a limited liability company.

The early years
MCB encountered numerous difficulties in its first hundred years. MCB opened its first branch in Curepipe, in the centre of the island, in 1920. It did not open another branch until after World War II.

Post-war growth
In 1949, Lloyds Bank became a shareholder. In 1955, MCB became a limited liability company. At this point MCB became the first bank to set up branches in rural locations: Mahébourg in 1955, Flacq in 1958, Triolet in 1959, and Goodlands in 1963. Other branches followed. In 1960, MCB bank moved to the current location of its headquarters at Sir William Newton Street (at the time, Rue de l'Eglise). Mauritius achieved its independence in 1968.

A regional leader
MCB began its international expansion in 1991 when it opened representative offices in Paris and Antananarivo, Madagascar. Together with Crédit Lyonnais (40%) and Banque de la Réunion (a subsidiary of Crédit Lyonnais-25%), MCB (35%) established Banque Internationale Des Mascareignes, an offshore unit based in Mauritius. (In 1998 Crédit Lyonnais confirmed the transfer to Caisse d'Épargne Provence-Alpes-Corse (CEPAC) of its remaining shares (25.5%) in Banque internationale des Mascareignes.) The next year, MCB became the majority shareholder of Banque Française Commerciale Océan Indien (BFCOI), which is registered in France, with the previous owner, Banque Indosuez, retaining an interest. BFCOI had branches in Réunion Island (9), Mayotte (4) and the Seychelles (1), and a head office in Paris. MCB also established Union Commercial Bank in Antananarivo. The original shareholders were MCB (70%), Standard Bank Investment Corporation Ltd (10%), BFCOI (10%), FIARO (5%) and Société Manofi (5%). By 2000, MCB's share ownership had risen to 79%. Currently, the bank has three branches. Then in 1992 MCB converted its representative office in Paris to a branch.

In 1999 MCB established União Comercial De Bancos (Moçambique) in Maputo, Mozambique in partnership with BFCOI and Proparco. By 2000 MCB's shareholding was 76% as it had bought out Proparco's 18.75% stake. The next year, MCB acquired the minority stake Crédit Agricole Indosuez held in BFCOI, increasing its own stake by 22.22% to 88.88%. This followed the takeover of Banque Indosuez by the Crédit Agricole Group, which itself had operations in both Réunion and Mayotte in direct competition with BFCOI.
  	
MCB acquired the minority stake Crédit Agricole Indosuez held in BFCOI, increasing its own stake by 22.22% to 88.88%. This followed the takeover of Banque Indosuez by the Crédit Agricole Group, which itself had operations in both Réunion and Mayotte in direct competition with BFCOI.
  		
In 2003, MCB and Société Générale agreed that they would split the ownership of BFCOI. However, the agreement did not include BFCOI's operations in the Seychelles. MCB therefore incorporated a new fully owned subsidiary, Mauritius Commercial Bank (Seychelles) – MCB Seychelles – to take over BFCOI's operations there.

Group reorganization 
Since its regional expansion, MCB operated as both a licensed bank and a holding company. In 2013, MCB embarked on a reorganization that sought to separate the banking and non-banking operations and raise capital in order to position itself for future growth. The restructure was as follows:
 MCB Group Limited was incorporated to be the ultimate holding company in the group.
 Shareholders of MCB exchanged their MCB shares for MCB Group shares on a 1:1 ratio. These shares were then listed on the SEM.
 MCB Investment Holding Ltd (MCBIH) was then incorporated to act as the intermediary holding company of all the banking investments of the Group.
 MCB's entire stock was transferred from MCB Group to MCBIH in exchange for shares.
 The Banking subsidiaries held by MCB were then unbundled to MCBIH while non-banking subsidiaries and investments were unbundled MCB Group.
At the end of the reorganization, MCB remained a commercial bank with no subsidiaries while MCB Group's structure operated under three clusters, i.e.:
 Banking
 Non-banking financial
 Other investments

Ownership 
The shares of MCB were listed on the Stock Exchange of Mauritius from 1989 to April 5, 2014 when they were replaced by those of MCB Group. Mauritius Commercial Bank is currently a wholly owned subsidiary of MCB Group.

Governance
Mauritius Commercial Bank is governed by an eight-person Board of Directors with J. Gérard HARDY serving as the President of the board and Pierre Guy NOEL as the CEO.

Moody's Ratings
 Foreign Currency Deposit Baa1/P-2
 Foreign Currency Issuer Baa1
 Global Local Currency Deposit Baa1/P-2
 Bank Financial Strength D+ 
 NSR Senior Debt -  MTN Program (foreign currency) Aa3.za 
 NSR Subordinated Debt -  MTN Program (foreign currency) A3.za

Controversy: Mauritius Commercial Bank / National Pensions Fund Scandal 

Early in February 2003, Amina Rojoa, the accountant responsible for the National Pensions Fund (NPF) deposit accounts, informed Prime Minister Sir Anerood Jugnauth, that the NPF deposits at the MCB could not be traced. On 14 February 2003, known afterwards as MCB's "Black Friday," the Mauritius Commercial Bank announced in a press communiqué that it had discovered a large scale fraud which had resulted in the misappropriation of over Rs. 600 m. between 1991 and 2002. The fraud was alleged to have been committed by one of the bank's senior managers, Robert Lesage. He was accused of “fraudulently abstracting funds belonging to the MCB” and “tampering with clients’ accounts. The MCB started proceedings in Mauritius against Lesage and thirty seven defendants. The most important ones involved were:

Angel Beach Resorts Ltd (1987): Teeren Appasamy, Dev Manraj and Donald Ha Yeung’s wife shareholders as from 1997. Teeren Appasamy and Marc Daruty de Grandpré directors since August 2001.
Belle Beach Ltd: Teeren Appasamy, sole director.
Handsome Investment Ltd (1991): Shareholders: Donald Ha Yeung & Mrs. Pit Ho Wong Ching Hwai.
Magarian Cie Ltd (1988): Bhardooaz Babeedin and Deochand Nundloll, shareholders. In 1994, Donald Ha Yeung joins in.  	 	
Mauri Beach Travel and Tours Ltd (1997): Dev Manraj (also director), Donald Ha Yeung and his wife (director) shareholders and Renu Manraj one of the directors.
Quartet Development Co Ltd (1986): First shareholders: Alain Richard Voon, Donald Ha Yeung, Prithiniah Geerjanand and Mrs Hurkissoon Rambaruth. Geerjanand Khoosman and Sudarshan Bhadain (Roshi Bhadain) became shareholders in 1990. The latter had claimed that without his knowledge shares in Quartet were put in his name while he was a student and to which he never consented.
Sea Rock Paradise Ltd (1989): The Ha Yeung couple buy shares of Masilamani and Veemlah Veerasamy.

The Independent Commission Against Corruption (ICAC) accused NPF accountant Rojoa of conspiracy with Lesage. Charged with embezzlement and money laundering, Lesage involved two top managers of the MCB. He was later granted immunity by the Independent Commission Against Corruption (ICAC). Attempts were made to challenge the immunity since it had not been granted or confirmed by the Director of Public Prosecution. As the investigation unfolded, ICAC identified the main beneficiary as London-based Mauritian businessman Teeren Appassamy. Money was credited to accounts of ten companies and five persons including Appassamy, the alleged master swindler. They are Dev Manraj, his companies’ director; economist Donald Ha Yeung, his agent; and his brother, Tamby Appasamy. They, as well as MCB top managers, were provisionally charged.
  	                                                        	
Teeren Appasamy pointed MCB General Manager, Pierre-Guy Noël, as the banker he had dealings with. The latter was charged of having “willfully and criminally conspired with Robert Lesage and Teeren Appasamy to engage in several transactions involving a sum of Rs 36 million”. This charge was later struck out on a technicality. MCB's Assistant General Manager, Philippe A. Forget was charged with “failing to report a suspicious transaction” as file manager for two companies of Teeren Appasamy. Philippe Forget, also a major shareholder of the prominent newspaper L'Express (Mauritius), was arrested and released on bail. Charges against Forget were eventually changed and then struck out.
  	 	
The fraud action was soon followed by a claim by MCB in Mauritius against Mauritius Union Assurance (MUA) under its insurance policies. MUA in turn claimed against its reinsurers, Dornoch Ltd., and others. On 19 January 2005 the reinsurers rejected MUA's claim because of negligent misstatement, non-disclosure, and deceit. They later served proceedings against MUA and MCB. The allegations of misrepresentation made against MUA and MCB were "based upon answers given in a Lloyds bankers policy proposal form signed by officers of MCB to the effect that it was a well run orthodox banking business when in fact it was nothing of the sort." MUA and MCB appealed to the Supreme Court of the United Kingdom, and their appeal was dismissed.
  		
In March 2005, a report by NTan Advisory Corporate (Singapore) was published in Le Mauricien. The report commissioned by the Bank of Mauritius, outlined unlawful banking practices at the Mauritius Commercial Bank.
  		
In October 2008, after reviewing evidence gathered by ICAC, the Director of Public Prosecution Gérard Angoh decided not to retain criminal charges against Lesage.
  	 	
In September 2009, ICAC initiated criminal action against the Mauritius Commercial Bank, as a corporate entity represented by Pierre-Guy Noël. MCB was charged to "wilfully, unlawfully and criminally fail to take such measures as are reasonably necessary, to wit : implementation of proper internal control systems and procedures, to ensure that services offered by it, to wit : in relation to the fixed deposit accounts held on behalf of the National Pensions Fund, were not capable of being used by a person to facilitate the commission of a money laundering offence.
  		
On 30 June 2010, in the civil action brought about by MCB against Lesage and others, Judges Paul Lam Shang Leen and Nirmala Devat of the Commercial Division of the Supreme Court, found that Lesage could not be believed and held him liable for the Rs 880 million fraud at the MCB. The justices ordered him to refund Rs 436 million to the bank. The co-defendant and ultimate beneficiary of the fraud, Teeren Appasamy, was ordered by the Court to pay the bank a sum of Rs 305 million. Donald Ha Yeung, was exonerated of all blame by the judges. Lesage appealed to the Supreme Court of Mauritius, but his appeal was denied on a technicality. He then appealed directly to the Judicial Committee of the Privy Council in London, UK, the highest court of appeal. On Dec. 20, 2012, Lord Kerr and four other Law Lords allowed Lesage's appeal, quashing the decision of the Supreme Court of Mauritius and ordering a new trial "free from the taint of unfairness and bias" before a differently constituted court.

Judges Paul Lam Shang Leen and Nirmala Devat of the Commercial Division of the Supreme Court, also found out that "those shell companies were nothing more than his conduit pipe and transactions effected without the knowledge of those who on paper were either shareholders or directors. Those companies were simply the instrument/facade to enable Mr. T. Appasamy to obtain huge sums from Mr. Lesage. As can be gleaned from the evidence of Mr. PG Noel, most if not all the monies, which had reached those shell companies, had practically been directed either to the various accounts of Mr. T.Appasamy or for his benefits."	

Court hearings in the case of ICAC v MCB have begun on Sept. 26, 2011.

See also
List of banks in Mauritius

References

Sources
 Mauritius Commercial Bank. 1963. The Mauritius Commercial Bank Limited, 1838-1963. (Port Louis: The Mauritius Commercial Bank).  		
 Moorlah, S. Barbé, A., Lutchmaya, J. "Corruption : Interpellés par l'ICAC, Ramdewar et Sauzier libérés sous caution" in lexpress.mu (May 17, 2003). Cf.
 Lexpress.mu. 2004. An intricate saga
 "A Bank within a Bank: Les libertés de la MCB à l'égard de la BoM !" in Week End (March 20, 2005)
 Ng Ping Cheun, E. "En quête de vérité" in Business Magazine (March 30, 2005)
 "Dornoch Ltd & Ors v Mauritius Union Assurance Company Ltd [2006 APP.L.R. 04/10" in Arbitration, Practice & Procedure Law Reports. Typeset by NADR. Crown Copyright reserved. [2006] EWCA Civ 389 6]
 MCB Press release (March 16, 2006)
 "MCB/NPF : L'ICAC et une enquête à controverses" in Week End (Oct. 19, 2008 
 "MCB/NPF : l'heure de grandes tractations!" in Week End (Sept. 6, 2009) 
 Modeliar S. "Mauritius Commercial Bank Ltd v Robert Lesage and Others’ The cat is still in the bag!" in Mauritius Times (July 8, 2010)
 Modeliar S. "N’Tan Report Revisited" in Mauritius Times (July 20, 2010)
 "Affaire ICAC vs MCB" in Le Mauricien (Sept. 26, 2011)

Banks of Mauritius
Companies listed on the Stock Exchange of Mauritius
Companies based in Port Louis
Banks established in 1838
1838 establishments in Mauritius